State Route 183 (SR 183) is a state highway in the U.S. state of California, entirely in Monterey County, running from U.S. Route 101 in Salinas to State Route 1 in Castroville.

Route description
SR 183 begins in the center of the city of Salinas at an at-grade interchange with U.S. Route 101. The road then heads toward the center of Salinas along North Main Street before abruptly turning northwest along Castroville Road. Following an interchange with Davis Road, the route exits town and enters an area covered with farmland. It continues through this central Monterey County while gradually turning north until it reaches southern Castroville, where it again turns northeast. The road then interchanges with State Route 156 and traverses northeast as the western boundary of Castroville before meeting its northern terminus, State Route 1, the Cabrillo Highway.

SR 183 is part of the California Freeway and Expressway System, and in Salinas is part of the National Highway System, a network of highways that are considered essential to the country's economy, defense, and mobility by the Federal Highway Administration.

History
This route was defined in 1933. It appears to have been unsigned before 1964.

Future
Senate Bill No. 1459, signed by the Governor on September 11, 2020, authorizes the California Transportation Commission to relinquish the segment of SR 183 within the City of Salinas to local control.

Major intersections

See also

References

External links

Caltrans: Route 183 highway conditions
California Highways: Route 183
California @ AARoads.com - State Route 183

183
State Route 183
Salinas, California